Kam'yanka, also known as Kamenka is a village in Luhansk Oblast (province) of Ukraine. The village's population is 482 (as of 2001).

Administratively, Kam'yanka belongs to the Luhansk Raion (district) of the oblast as a part of the Kam'yans'ka local council.

All Religions Mount 

 

In 1992, at the above coordinates settled famous Ukrainian archaeologist Nikolay Tarasenko, who laid there basement for All World's Religions Temple. Now, on this basement grew Orthodox All Saints Temple.

Nearby are staying Catholic chapel and the Buddhist stupa. April 28, 2003 at the stupa celebrated the 750th anniversary of Namu-Myo-Ho-Ren-Ge-Kyo, which gathered a large number of guests. Organizers was Nicholay Tarasenko and now rested in peace Roman Turchin.

The Mount has visited Roman Turchin's mentor — a famous monk-pacifist, Teacher of the Order Nipponzan Myohoji in Eurasia and Advisor of Inter Religious Federation of World Peace (IRFWP) — Junsei Terasawa

Being involved in the activities of the Don Cossacks, including religious, Nikolay Ivanovich Tarasenko was initiated into many religious doctrines, so in spite of his current recess in the Orthodox Church he can not divide God, because appreciates people and what they do in their quest for God.

See also 
 Pan'kivka. Peace Pagoda Building

Notes

References

Further reading 
 

Yekaterinoslav Governorate
Villages in Luhansk Raion
Articles containing video clips